Eulophonotus elegans is a moth in the family Cossidae. The moth is found in Sierra Leone, Cameroon, the Republic of Congo, Equatorial Guinea and Tanzania.

References

Natural History Museum Lepidoptera generic names catalog

Zeuzerinae